Players and pairs who neither have high enough rankings nor receive wild cards may participate in a qualifying tournament held one week before the annual Wimbledon Tennis Championships.

Seeds

  Martina Suchá (qualified)
  Claudine Schaul (second round)
  Tzipora Obziler (first round)
  Meilen Tu (second round)
  Arantxa Parra Santonja (qualifying competition, lucky loser)
  Ľubomíra Kurhajcová (second round)
  Wynne Prakusya (second round)
  Renata Voráčová (first round)
  María Vento-Kabchi (second round)
  Eva Fislová (qualified)
  Maureen Drake (qualified)
  Mara Santangelo (second round)
  Seda Noorlander (qualifying competition, lucky loser)
  Julia Schruff (qualifying competition)
  Jelena Janković (first round)
  Olga Barabanschikova (first round)
  Vanessa Webb (first round)
  Milagros Sequera (qualified)
  Sofia Arvidsson (second round)
  Gisela Dulko (second round)
  Mashona Washington (first round)
  Adriana Serra Zanetti (second round)
  Tara Snyder (first round)
  Libuše Průšová (second round)

Qualifiers

  Martina Suchá
  Stanislava Hrozenská
  Carly Gullickson
  Janet Lee
  Milagros Sequera
  Bea Bielik
  Anikó Kapros
  Selima Sfar
  Lilia Osterloh
  Eva Fislová
  Maureen Drake
  Barbora Strýcová

Lucky losers

  Arantxa Parra Santonja
  Seda Noorlander

Qualifying draw

First qualifier

Second qualifier

Third qualifier

Fourth qualifier

Fifth qualifier

Sixth qualifier

Seventh qualifier

Eighth qualifier

Ninth qualifier

Tenth qualifier

Eleventh qualifier

Twelfth qualifier

External links

2003 Wimbledon Championships on WTAtennis.com
2003 Wimbledon Championships – Women's draws and results at the International Tennis Federation

Women's Singles Qualifying
Wimbledon Championship by year – Women's singles qualifying
Wimbledon Championships